The Foot Locker Elite Classic – High Stakes Hoops was a basketball tournament held in Adelaide, South Australia from 6 to 11 April 2010. There were eight teams in the competition (Coasters, Cyclones, Fleet, Monarchs, Pythons, Rays, Reef and Rush) and players from across the globe participated. There was a total prize pool of $250,000, with the competition being broadcast on Australia's One HD channel.

The High Stakes Hoops competition was held outside of the normal NBL season and had a number of rules which were different from NBL and FIBA. These included using jump balls to settle tie-ups with no use of the possession arrow, only allowing one full timeout and one 20-second timeout in each half, and running 48-minute games.

A new concept used throughout the tournament was the 'Game Breaker' play. Twice during each game, the coach could elect to use a 'Game Breaker' play when for the next three minutes of clock time, the team in the 'Game Breaker' phase had each successful three-point shot counted as four points. The team's backboard was lit in green during this time.

The Rays, a team consisting of Adam Gibson, Tony Ronaldson, Peter Crawford, Damian Martin and Kevin Lisch, won the tournament.

References

Basketball in South Australia
Basketball competitions in Australia
Basketball leagues in Australia
Professional sports leagues in Australia
2010 in Australian sport